The Yên River is a river of Quảng Nam Province and Da Nang, Vietnam. It flows for 30 kilometres.

References

Rivers of Da Nang
Rivers of Quảng Nam province
Rivers of Vietnam